The Dubai International is an open international badminton open tournament held in Dubai, United Arab Emirates. The event is part of the Badminton World Federation's International Challenge and part of the Badminton Asia Circuit.

Previous winners

Performances by nation

References

Badminton tournaments in the United Arab Emirates
Sports competitions in Dubai